Joan Swart  (born September 28, 1965) is a South African psychologist, author, consultant and researcher. Dr. Swart has completed a Masters in Forensic Psychology at the HLC-accredited Walden University and a doctorate at the BPPE-approved Eisner Institute for Professional Studies, based in Encino, California. She is currently a consultant and researcher at the Apsche Institute, based in Leesburg, Virginia.

Background and education
Swart was born in Vereeniging, South Africa and completed her school education at Handhaaf Primary School and Brandwag High School where she matriculated with six distinctions. She completed a BSc. (Chem. Eng.) degree at Stellenbosch University before working for various corporates, including Denel, Sasol, Sappi, and Mondi in various technical, business, and managerial roles. Pursuing a lifelong interest, she completed a master's degree in Forensic Psychology at Walden University, Minnesota in 2011, and a doctorate in Forensic Psychology at the Eisner Institute for Professional Studies, based in Encino, CA in 2013. She is currently involved in private forensic psychology consultations, as well as research and consulting at the Apsche Institute based in Leesburg, VA, a consulting committee member of the American Investigative Society of Cold Cases (AISOCC), a member of the Multidisciplinary Collaborative on Sexual Crime and Violence, and a review board member of the International Journal of Behavioral Consultation and Therapy.

She has also competed in a variety of sporting activities, and completed various long-distance running events, including the Everest Marathon, Boston Marathon, and Comrades Marathon (3 times).

Early projects and specializations

Swart was affiliated with the Apsche Institute where she conducts research and consultation. The Apsche Center specializes in Mode Deactivation Therapy, a third-wave cognitive-behavioral therapy approach that was developed to treat adolescents with behavioral problems.

She was also a consulting committee member at the American Investigative Society of Cold Cases (AISOCC), which is a multidisciplinary group of scholar/practitioners, investigators, and others whose goal is to review cold cases in order to develop new leads/information and/or investigative strategies for the requesting agencies. She is a member of the AISOCC Behavioral Sciences Committee and Social Media Committee.

Swart was an editorial board member of the peer-reviewed journal, International Journal of Behavioral Consultation and Therapy (IJBCT), that is published by the American Psychological Association (APA).

Coaching, supervising, and curriculum writing

Swart was the Head of Curriculum and coaching supervisor at the Jay Shetty Certification School from September 2019.

Swart is the Chief Editor of Jay Shetty's Purpose Ed magazine. In an interview in the launch issue, she spoke about how her Forensic Psychology work prepared her to better understand and appreciate the collective effects of trauma, which motivates her continued work in coaching, training, and education.

Publications

Since her involvement with Forensic Psychology, Joan has produced many peer-reviewed and other publications, and presentations.

 Swart, J., & Mellor, L. (2020). Homicide: A forensic psychology casebook. Boca Raton, FL: CRC Press.
 Anrtfield, M., & Swart, J. (2018). Social media and mental health: Depression, predators, and personality disorders. San Diego, CA: Cognella.
 Swart, J., Bass, C. K., & Apsche, J. A. (2015). Treating adolescents with family-based mindfulness. New York, NY: Springer.
 Swart, J., & Apsche, J. A. (2014). Family Mode Deactivation Therapy (FMDT) mediation analysis. International Journal of Behavioral Consultation and Therapy, 9(1), 1-13.
 Swart, J., & Apsche, J. A. (2014). A comparative treatment efficacy study of conventional therapy and Mode Deactivation Therapy (MDT) for adolescents with mood disorders, mixed personality disorders, and experiences of childhood trauma. International Journal of Behavioral Consultation and Therapy, 9(1), 23-29.
 Swart, J., & Apsche, J. A. (2014). Family Mode Deactivation Therapy (FMDT): A randomized controlled trial for adolescents with complex issues. International Journal of Behavioral Consultation and Therapy, 9(1), 14-22.
 Swart, J., & Apsche, J. A. (2014). Family Mode Deactivation Therapy (FMDT) as a contextual treatment. International Journal of Behavioral Consultation and Therapy, 9(1), 30-37.
 Swart, J. (2013). Homicide in armed conflict: A psychological perspective. Cape Town, South Africa: Quickfox Publishing. .
 Swart, J. (2011, September). Prospects of criminal profiling: A critical review of the BRACE profile. 17th South African Psychology Congress, Johannesburg, South Africa.
 Swart, J. (2012, July). Female partner serial sex offenders: Folie à deux or coercion. 30th International Congress of Psychology, Cape Town, South Africa.
 Swart, J. (2011). Future prospects of criminal profiling: A meta-analysis and critical review. M.S. Dissertation. Walden University, Minneapolis, MN.
 Swart, J. (2012). In defense of Syria: The speeches of President Bashar al-Assad. Cape Town, South Africa: Quickfox Publishing. .
 Swart, J. (2013). Homicide of civilians in armed conflict: A psychological perspective of offenders. Psy.D. Dissertation. Eisner Institute for Professional Studies, Encino, CA.
 Swart, J. (2013). Profiling the psychopath. Cape Town, South Africa: Quickfox Publishing. .
 Swart, J. (2011, September). Epigenetics and prediction of antisocial behavior: A literature review and prospects for research. 17th South African Psychology Conference, Johannesburg, South Africa.
 Swart, J. (2013). Predisposition, antecedents, and prevention of police office familial homicide suicide: Case analyses in the South African context. Psy.D. research proposal. Eisner Institute for Professional Studies, Encino, CA.

See also
 Jack A. Apsche
 Mode Deactivation Therapy

References

1965 births
Living people
South African psychologists
South African women psychologists
Stellenbosch University alumni
Walden University (Minnesota) alumni